Oscar Peterson Plays George Gershwin is a 1952 album by pianist Oscar Peterson of popular songs written by George Gershwin and Ira Gershwin.

In 1956, Columbia released a series of individual "clef series" 45rpms under the same title with 4 selected tracks from the original LP record.

Verve Records reissued the album in 1985 under the title "Oscar Peterson - The George Gershwin Songbook" in Germany through PolyGram.

Track listing
"The Man I Love"
"Fascinating Rhythm
"It Ain't Necessarily So"
"Somebody Loves Me
"Strike Up The Band"
"I've Got a Crush On You"
"I Was Doing All Right"
"S'Wonderful"
"Oh, Lady be Good!"
"I Got Rhythm"
"A Foggy Day"
"Love Walked In"

Credits
Ray Brown – double bass
Barney Kessel – guitar
Oscar Peterson – piano

References

1959 albums
Oscar Peterson albums
Albums produced by Norman Granz
George and Ira Gershwin tribute albums
Clef Records albums